Woodlawn is an unincorporated community in Montgomery County, Tennessee.

Geography
Woodlawn is located along U.S. Route 79 west of neighboring Clarksville. It is part of the Clarksville, TN–KY Metropolitan Statistical Area.

Post office
The community has a post office with the ZIP code of 37191.

Education
An elementary school in the community is operated by the Clarksville-Montgomery County School System.

References

Unincorporated communities in Tennessee
Unincorporated communities in Montgomery County, Tennessee
Clarksville metropolitan area